A counterweight is a weight that provides balance and stability in a mechanical system. 

Counterweight may also refer to:
"Counterweight" (The Outer Limits), a 1964 television episode
Counterweight, an organization founded by British author Helen Pluckrose
Counterweight, an alias of the fictional comics character Jack Power
Counterweight, an alias of the fictional comics character Katie Power